The cinereous ground tyrant (Muscisaxicola cinereus) is a species of bird in the family Tyrannidae.  The term cinereous describes its colouration.  It is found in Argentina, Bolivia, Chile, and Peru.  Its natural habitat is subtropical or tropical high-altitude grassland.

References 

Muscisaxicola
Birds described in 1864
Taxonomy articles created by Polbot